Charles "Charlie" William Carr (birth unknown – death unknown) was an English professional rugby league footballer who played in the 1920s and 1930s.

Playing career

International honours
Charlie Carr won caps for England while at Barrow in 1924 against Other Nationalities, in 1925 against Wales (2 matches), in 1926 against Wales, and Other Nationalities, in 1927 against Wales, in 1928 against Wales, and won caps for Great Britain while at Barrow in 1924 against Australia (2 matches), and New Zealand (2 matches), in 1926–27 against New Zealand (3 matches).

Career records
, Carr is fifth in Barrow's all time try scorers list with 161-tries. He is an inductee to the club's Hall of Fame.

References

External links

Barrow Raiders players
England national rugby league team players
English rugby league players
Great Britain national rugby league team players
Lancashire rugby league team players
Rugby league centres
Rugby league players from Yorkshire
Rugby league wingers
Sportspeople from the East Riding of Yorkshire